Bagnet (Northern Ilocano and Tagalog pronunciation: ,), locally also known as "chicharon" in Ilocano, is a Filipino dish consisting of pork belly (liempo) boiled and deep fried until it is crispy. It is seasoned with garlic, black peppercorns, bay leaves, and salt. The meat is first boiled and then allowed to thoroughly dry overnight before frying to achieve its characteristic chicharon-like texture. Bagnet can be eaten on its own or with white rice. It can also be eaten as part of other dishes like pinakbet and dinardaraan.

Bagnet is traditionally dipped in sauces based on vinegar (usually sukang iloko), bagoong (fermented fish or shrimp paste), or (more rarely) pig's blood.

Etymology 
Bagnet came from the word "bagnetin", which means to “preserve the pork”. They are preserved by boiling and frying the slabs of pork before refrigerating, and then twice fried when ready to serve.

In popular culture 
The popularity of bagnet served as a character plot point in the Filipino film I'm Drunk, I Love You with Carson, played by Maja Salvador, depicted craving for the dish to the point of creating an impromptu "bagnet dance" to celebrate it.

See also
 Crispy pata
 Lechon kawali

References

Philippine pork dishes
Deep fried foods